Batavia may refer to:

Historical places
 Batavia (region), a land inhabited by the Batavian people during the Roman Empire, today part of the Netherlands
 Batavia, Dutch East Indies, present-day Jakarta, the former capital of the Dutch East Indies (1619–1949)
 Old Batavia, the original downtown area of Jakarta
 Jakarta, the modern-day city, capital of Indonesia
 Batavian Republic, the Netherlands from 1795 to 1806 as a French vassal state, Batavia being the Latin name of the Low countries
 Passau, Germany, called Batavis or Batavia by the Romans

Modern places

United States
 Batavia, California, an unincorporated community in Solano County, California
 Batavia, Illinois, a city in Kane County, Illinois, named for the city in New York
 Batavia, Iowa, a city in Jefferson County, Iowa
 Batavia, Michigan, a community in Branch County, Michigan
 Batavia, New York, a city which is the county seat of Genesee County, New York, named for the region in the Netherlands
 Batavia (town), New York, in Genesee County, New York
 Batavia Kill (Schoharie Creek tributary), a river in Greene County, New York
 Batavia, Ohio, a town and the county seat of Clermont County, Ohio
 Batavia, Wisconsin, an unincorporated community in Sheboygan County, Wisconsin
 Batavia Township (disambiguation), several communities

Elsewhere
 Batavia, Suriname, a former leper colony site in Suriname
 Batavia Road, an anchorage in Western Australia

Transportation
 Batavia (1628 ship), a ship of the Dutch East India Company shipwrecked on her maiden voyage on the coast of Australia in 1629
Batavia (1995 ship), a seaworthy replica of the same ship
 Batavia (1802 ship), an English ship
 Batavia Road (boat), one of the first boats used for a commercial tourist operation in the Houtman Abrolhos
 Batavia Air, an Indonesian airline

Sport
 Batavia F.C., an Indonesian football club based in South Jakarta
 Batavia Union F.C., an Indonesian football club based in North Jakarta

Other uses
 Batavia, a type of lettuce with broad flat leaves
 Batavia (cloth), an 18th-century silk fabric, popular for dress in France, made in Batavia now (Jakarta)
 Batavia (opera), by Richard Mills
 Batavia Institute, a registered historic place in Batavia, Illinois
 Batavia, a group of islands in Dougal Dixon's book After Man: A Zoology of the Future
 Batavia Knoll, a submerged microcontinent part of the Naturaliste Plateau

See also 
 Batavians, a Germanic tribe living during the Roman Empire in the area of the Rhine delta
 
 
 Batavi (disambiguation)
 Betawi (disambiguation)
 Betawi people, named after Batavia, Dutch East Indies